Nuclear distribution protein nudE-like 1 is a protein that in humans is encoded by the NDEL1 gene.

This gene encodes a thiol-activated oligopeptidase that is phosphorylated in M phase of the cell cycle. Phosphorylation regulates the cell cycle-dependent distribution of this protein, with a fraction of the protein bound strongly to centrosomes in interphase and localized to mitotic spindles in early M phase. Overall, this protein plays a role in nervous system development. Alternate transcriptional splice variants, encoding different isoforms, have been characterized.

Interactions 

NDEL1 has been shown to interact with Cyclin-dependent kinase 5, YWHAE, PAFAH1B1 and DISC1.

References

Further reading 

 
 
 
 
 
 
 
 
 
 
 
 
 
 
 

Human proteins